The Land Before Time XI: Invasion of the Tinysauruses is a 2005 direct-to-video animated film and the 11th film in The Land Before Time series. It was released on January 11, 2005, by Universal Studios Home Entertainment.

Plot 
Every year, as the warm season approaches, a certain tree in the Great Valley blooms with pink flowers. These "treesweets" are viewed as a delicacy by the dinosaurs of the valley and everyone wants their fair share of it. However, because of the tastiness of the tree sweets, and due to the fact that there seems to only be one such tree in the entire valley, there is hardly enough for every dinosaur. Because of this, none of them may eat the treesweets until the day when they reach the "peak of their tastiness." Littlefoot and his friends Ducky, Petrie and Spike wait to eat the first treesweets of the season. Ducky is about to take one, but Littlefoot quickly tells her to stop, reminding them that they may not take any treesweets until "Nibbling Day". This, however, does not stop Petrie from flying to the tree's crown to attempt to take a treesweet, until Cera's father, emerges and states clearly how every dinosaur in the valley has waited all year to taste the treesweets. As Cera appears before them, she boastfully reminds the group that she is the one who is supposed to eat the first treesweet, having been the one who found the treesweet-tree in the first place, although it was Littlefoot who first found it. Cera also teases Littlefoot for being too little to reach the treesweets, offending him.

Meanwhile, Mr. Threehorn is visited by an old friend, a pink female threehorn named Tria. Topps, whom Tria calls Topsy, promises Tria the first treesweet of the season, and Cera becomes jealous. Cera refuses to make friends with Tria and dismisses her. In addition, Cera becomes violent toward her friends when they make any references involving Tria or her father's nickname. Littlefoot wanders off by himself and sulks about how "little" he is. When he returns to the treesweet tree, he climbs the cliff next to it and tries to prove that he can reach the treesweets himself. As he does, he accidentally slips off the cliff, falls right through the tree, and knocks down every single treesweet. Realizing the trouble that he is now in, poor Littlefoot faints in dismay. When he wakes up, he finds himself surrounded by several miniature longnecks (known by their group as tinysauruses). They have eaten all the treesweets and quickly run away once the shocked Littlefoot starts screaming in fear.

Upon noticing that every treesweet is gone, the other dinosaurs suspect that Littlefoot is responsible. Afraid to admit that he made the treesweets fall off the tree under Topps' threat of being banished from the valley, Littlefoot makes a parish truth and blames nearly everything that had happened on the tinysauruses. At first, everyone laughs at him in disbelief, but when they find teeth-marks on an eaten treesweet that are too small for Littlefoot to have made, he is believed and everyone begins to look for the tinysauruses, thinking of them as pests and preparing to drive them out of the valley. As Littlefoot and Cera search the valley, Littlefoot falls down a pothole in the ground where the tinysauruses are hiding. At first, Littlefoot is afraid of them and flees deeper into the cave, but he soon finds them to be nice and befriends them. Upon hearing how difficult it is for the tinysauruses to find food, Littlefoot promises to help bring them as much food as he can every night.

Littlefoot's friends find him while he is bringing food to the tinysauruses. They also fall in the pothole, and upon meeting the tiny dinosaurs agree not to tell the adults. Even Cera, who is still angry with her father, promises to keep it a secret, mainly because she finds out she can relate to them more than they would have imagined. Many of the tinysauruses, including Lizzie, in the colony feel that their leader, Big Daddy, bosses them around too much, though he is only looking out for them. To Big Daddy, the larger dinosaurs of the Great Valley only seem to think that "because they're bigger, it makes them seem more important," and he does not trust the other dinosaurs. By morning, Cera finally decides to be friends with Tria.

When sneaking off to see the tinysauruses the following night, Littlefoot and his friends are discovered by Topps. When he tries to ask them where they are going this time of night, Cera angrily throws the question back at him. He tells the children that he is on guard duty it is the tinysauruses which they have to worry about, then warns them to not let him catch them out late at night again, and sends them home. Afterwards, he meets up with Tria and they spot two of the tinysauruses, Lizzie and Skitter. A chase ensues that ends when Topps and Tria, who tries to stop Topps, finds the tinysaurus colony. Topps gathers the other adults to let them know that he has found the little creatures. As the grown-ups prepare to block the caverns, Littlefoot, realizing what he must do, stops them and admits the full truth that he unintentionally caused the treesweets to fall from the tree first. However, just as he is finished admitting his accident with the adults softly forgiving him and finally leaving the little creatures alone, the tinysauruses' cave collapses, seemingly trapping them inside.

The tinysauruses escape into the Mysterious Beyond, where they encounter a pair of Utahraptors who chase them back into the Great Valley. Upon hearing that Littlefoot initially blamed everything on the tinysauruses, Littlefoot's friends become upset and do not want to talk with him. Angry at his friends' rejection, Littlefoot leaves and decides to set things right on his own. Meanwhile, Cera apologizes to Tria about her father being hard on her when she tried to stop him from hunting the little creatures down. After a tragic mistake, Petrie, Ducky, and Spike feel remorseful for what they have done and begin to sob over the loss of their friend. With Cera's help, they all try to find Littlefoot and apologize for being hard on him; but they mistake the sharpteeth for Littlefoot, and the two carnivores chase them through the Great Valley. Just as Ducky is about to be eaten, Littlefoot shows up and saves her, Topps and Tria also appear. When all seems lost, the tinysauruses come to the children's aid and fight the carnivores. The grown-ups of the valley eventually reach the group and drive the sharpteeth back into the Mysterious Beyond through the same hole, which they cover up with a large boulder to prevent them from coming back.

After everything is sorted out and friendships are repaired, the tinysauruses become residents of the valley. Nibbling Day finally comes at last, and Littlefoot is able to reach the treesweets by himself after all. His grandfather notes how he’s grown especially when he stood up for the tinysauruses. As they enjoy the fruity blossoms, everybody of all sizes learn how even small things can make a big difference.

Voice cast 

 Aaron Spann as Littlefoot 
 Anndi McAfee as Cera/Diplodocus
 Aria Curzon as Ducky
 Jeff Bennett as Petrie
 Rob Paulsen as Spike/Kosh
 Leigh Kelly as Skitter
 Cree Summer as Lizzie/Bonehead
 Nika Futterman as Rocky
 Ashley Rose Orr as Dusty
 Michael Clarke Duncan as Big Daddy
 Kenneth Mars as Grandpa Longneck/Longneck
 Miriam Flynn as Grandma Longneck
 John Ingle as Narrator/Topsy
 Camryn Manheim as Tria
 Tress MacNeille as Mama Swimmer/Petrie's mother

Music 
The music score was composed by Michael Tavera. Some of his arrangements of James Horner's original themes from the first film can be heard in two shots of the film (one where Ducky, Petrie, and Spike tell Littlefoot why they are mad at him and the other where the Sharpteeth come out of a cave), though Horner was uncredited in this film. This was the last time that Tavera's arrangements of Horner's themes was heard in a Land Before Time film, as Horner died in a plane crash on June 22, 2015. Tavera's older themes from previous sequels can also be heard in other scenes from the film.

The music that plays in the background when Topsy catches Petrie trying to get one of the blossoms is the booby trap sliding scene music from An American Tail: The Treasure of Manhattan Island.

Release 
 January 11, 2005 - VHS & DVD, the last Land Before Time film ever released on VHS
 September 19, 2006 - DVD – 2 Tales of Discovery and Friendship
 August 5, 2008 - Carrying Case DVD with Fun Activity Book – 2 Tales of Discovery and Friendship – Universal Watch on the Go

Reception 
The Land Before Time XI: Invasion of the Tinysauruses is considered by many critics and fans to be among the worst in the series alongside The Land Before Time XIII: The Wisdom of Friends, with many citing a confusing storyline and poorly-written songs.

References

External links 

 
 

2005 films
2005 animated films
2005 direct-to-video films
2000s American animated films
2000s children's animated films
Animated films about dinosaurs
American sequel films
Direct-to-video sequel films
Films scored by Michael Tavera
The Land Before Time films
Universal Animation Studios animated films
Universal Pictures direct-to-video animated films
2000s English-language films